Suzhounese (Suzhounese: sou1 tseu1 ghe2 gho6  [] ), also known as the Suzhou dialect, is the variety of Chinese traditionally spoken in the city of Suzhou in Jiangsu Province, China. Suzhounese is a variety of Wu Chinese, and was traditionally considered the Wu Chinese prestige dialect. Suzhounese has a large vowel inventory and it is relatively conservative in initials by preserving voiced consonants from Middle Chinese.

Distribution
Suzhou dialect is spoken within the city itself and the surrounding area, including migrants living in nearby Shanghai.

The Suzhou dialect is mutually intelligible with dialects spoken in its satellite cities such as Kunshan, Changshu, and Zhangjiagang, as well as those spoken in its former satellites Wuxi and Shanghai. It is also partially intelligible with dialects spoken in other areas of the Wu cultural sphere such as Hangzhou and Ningbo. However, it is not mutually intelligible with Cantonese or Standard Chinese; but, as all public schools and most broadcast communication in Suzhou use Mandarin exclusively, nearly all speakers of the dialect are at least bilingual. Owing to migration within China, many residents of the city cannot speak the local dialect but can usually understand it after a few months or years in the area.

History

Plural pronouns
Second- and third-person pronouns are suffixed with 笃  for the plural. The first-person plural is a separate root, 伲 .

Varieties
Some non-native speakers of Suzhou dialect speak Suzhou dialect in a "stylized variety" to tell tales.

Phonology

Initials

The Suzhou dialect has series of voiced, voiceless, and aspirated stops, and voiceless and voiced fricatives. Moreover, palatalized initials also occur.

Finals

 
Syllabic continuants:      

Notes:
The Suzhou dialect has a rare contrast between "fricative vowels"  and ordinary vowels .
 is pronounced  before rounded vowels.

Middle Chinese  rimes have become glottal stops, .

In the Suzhou dialect, [gə] is a very special demonstrative that is used alongside a separate set of proximal and distal demonstratives. [gə] can indicate referents appearing in a speech situation, which may be close to or far away from the deictic center, and under these conditions, [gə] is always used in combination with gestures. Hence [gə] can serve both proximal and distal functions.

Tones
Suzhou is considered to have seven tones. However, since the tone split dating from Middle Chinese still depends on the voicing of the initial consonant, these constitute just three phonemic tones: ping, shang, and qu. (Ru syllables are phonemically toneless.)

In Suzhou, the Middle Chinese Shang tone has partially merged with the modern yin qu tone.

Suzhou dialect in literature 
Ballad-narratives

A "ballad–narrative" known as "The story of Xue Rengui crossing the sea and Pacifying Liao", which is about the Tang dynasty hero Xue Rengui is believed to have been written in the Suzhou dialect.

Novels

Han Bangqing wrote Lives of Shanghai Flowers, one of the earliest novels in Wu dialect, in Suzhou dialect. Suzhou serves as an important drive for Han to write the novel. Suzhou dialect is used in  innovative methods to demonstrate urban space and time, as well as the interrupted narrative aesthetics, making it an integral part of an effort, which is presented as a fundamental and self-conscious new thing.  Han's novel also inspired other authors to write in Wu dialect.

See also
Wu Chinese
Shanghainese
Hangzhounese
Ningbonese
List of varieties of Chinese

References

External links
Wu Association

Languages of China
Wu Chinese
Culture in Suzhou
City colloquials